Mike Katiba (born 7 July 1995) is a Zambian football midfielder for Green Buffaloes.

References

1995 births
Living people
Zambian footballers
Zambia international footballers
Mufulira Wanderers F.C. players
Green Buffaloes F.C. players
Association football midfielders
Zambia A' international footballers
2018 African Nations Championship players